Ous Ibrahim Mohammed Albu-Mohammed  (born on 1 January 1986 in Iraq) is an Iraqi footballer who is a full back for Duhok sc and a member of the Iraq u-21. Ous' younger brother is Khaldoun Ibrahim, a member of Iraq national football team and one of the winners of the 2007 Asian Cup.

External links
 Goalzz.com
 

Iraqi footballers
Iraq international footballers
Al-Zawraa SC players
Erbil SC players
Living people
1986 births
Sportspeople from Baghdad
Al-Shorta SC players
Association football defenders